Netherton  is a hamlet with population of 50 living in 20 households. It  is part of the civil parish  of Elmley Castle, Bricklehampton & Netherton in the Wychavon district of Worcestershire,  and  lies about a mile from Elmley Castle. Evesham, the nearest town, is five miles East North East. To the south-west lies Bredon Hill.

History

The hamlet contains the remains of a 12th-century chapel, and is on  the edge of the northern slopes of the Bredon Hill  Area of Outstanding Natural Beauty. The Anglican parish was annexed to Elmley Castle in 1864.

References

External links
 Parish Council web site
 Romanesque chapel

External links

 Romanesque chapel

Hamlets in Worcestershire